is a Japanese film director. After studying filmmaking in the College of Art at Nihon University, he won an award for his independent short Inaka no hōsoku at the Pia Film Festival in 1984. He directed his first commercial feature, Bataashi kingyo, in 1990 and received a number of awards for best new director, including the Hochi Film Award. He won the Japan Academy Prize for best director for his film Tokyo Tower: Mom and Me, and Sometimes Dad. Matsuoka is known for his delicate depictions of complicated romantic and familial relationships, including a homosexual triangle in Kirakira Hikaru, a daughter caring for an abusive but now senile mother in Akashia no Michi, and a son caring for a cancer-stricken mother in Tokyo Tower. He has also shot many television commercials. His best known and most successful TV show is the Midnight Diner - Tokyo Stories.

Director

Films
 Bataashi Kingyo (1990)
 Kirakira Hikaru (1992)
 Toire no Hanako-san (1995)
 Akashia no Michi  (2001)
 Sayonara, Kuro (2003)
 Tokyo Tower: Mom and Me, and Sometimes Dad (2007)
 Kanki no Uta (2008)
 Snow Prince (2009)
 Midnight Diner (2014)
Midnight Diner 2 (2016)

TV Dramas
Midnight Diner - Tokyo Stories  (2009 - 2019)

References

External links

Japan Academy Prize for Director of the Year winners
Japanese film directors
1961 births
Living people
People from Ichinomiya, Aichi
Nihon University alumni